The 2009 season of 1. deild karla was the 55th season of second-tier football in Iceland.

League table

Top scorers

References
 RSSSF Page

1. deild karla (football) seasons
Iceland
Iceland
2